Chloe Sanderson may refer to:

Chloe Sanderson, character in McLeod's Daughters
Chloe Sanderson, character in Best Friends Getting Sorted